James Callahan (February 2, 1812July 27, 1889) was a 19th-century American New York Sandy Hook Pilot. He is well known for being one of the oldest Sandy Hook pilots, having served for 38 years. He was owner and operator of the William Bell that was captured and burned by the Confederate raiding steamer CSS Tallahassee during the American Civil War.

Early life

James Callahan was born in Philadelphia, Pennsylvania on February 2, 1812. He was the son of parents of Irish descent. He married Rebecca Hammond (1815-1875) from Pennsylvania. They had six children. Rebecca died on January 8, 1875. Callahan became friends with pilot Robert Dent who had two sisters, Sarah and Mary Dent. On December 5, 1877, Callahan (65) married in Brooklyn, New York to his second wife, Sarah Elizabeth Dent who was 54. When Sarah died, Callahan, now 72, married his third wife, the sister Mary Dent, on August 11, 1885.

Career
Callahan had a 38-year career as a New York Sandy Hook pilot. He started as a pilot in 1851.

On May 21, 1856, Callahan was questioned by New York Commissioners regarding the navigation of the New York Harbor. He said that he was, at that time, a Sandy Hook pilot for eleven years. He mentioned that the tides in the East River run faster since he was first appointed a pilot. He said that the tides have increased in the East River since the construction and extension of the docks and piers from the New York and Brooklyn shores. He talked about a dangerous rock off Jackson Street ferry in the East River on the New York side; and that  Romer Shoal Light lighthouse should be placed on the south east point of Romer shoals so pilots could tell the commencement of the shoal.

William Bell

Callahan was part owner of the pilot boat William Bell built in Greenpoint, Brooklyn, New York, in 1864. The other owners were Joseph Henderson, John Van Deusen, and William Anderson.

On August 11, 1864, the William Bell ventured too far out to sea and was captured and burned by the Confederate raiding steamer CSS Tallahassee during the American Civil War. The objective in capturing the vessel was to secure a pilot who would take the privateer Tallahassee through Hell Gate into Long Island Sound and set fire to the shipping ports on both sides. The William Bell was 70 miles east southeast of Sandy Hook, south of New York.

In the book, "From Sandy Hook to 62", Charles Edward Russell, describes the chase of the Tallahassee cruiser against William Bell. The Confederate Colonel, John Taylor Wood, fired three shots at the William Bell and ordered Pilot Callahan to come on board the Tallahassee. He then ordered his men to go on board the pilot boat and remove everything that was movable and bring it on board the Tallahassee. Wood then ordered the William Bell to be burned. Wood said "Turpentine her and set her on fire."

The next day, Colonel Wood captured another vessel, the bark Suliote, of Belfast, Maine. Passengers from the William Bell and the burned packet ship Adriatic were transferred to the Suliote. James Callahan was ordered to pilot the Suliote into Sandy Hook, New York.

Susquehanna 

On August 13, 1864, while on the bark Suliote, Callahan met up with the United States steamer Susquehanna, cruising for the privateer. The Susquehanna supplied Callahan and the passengers on the Suliote with bread. On  August 14, Callahan and the Suliote arrived in New York.

Recommissioned on July 20, 1864, the Susquehanna was assigned to the North Atlantic Blockading Squadron and participated in the First Battle on Fort Fisher, on Christmas Eve 1864. Near the end of the American Civil War, on January 13, 1865, the United States Navy admiral, David Dixon Porter shifted fire to Fort Fisher itself. On January 17, in the successful assault and capture, by the Union Army, Navy and Marine Corps at the second battle of Fort Fisher south of Wilmington, North Carolina, the U.S. frigate Susquehanna was under command of Rear Admiral Sylvanus William Godon. Gordan said that "James Callahan, coast pilot, whom I at all times found most servicable." During the attack at Fort Fisher, Callahan was at the helm of the Susquehanna maneuvered the vessel to protect the crew from injury and guided the ship safely into port. The battle closed Wilmington, North Carolina, the Confederate States's last major port.

Alabama Claims

On February 23, 1883, Callahan successfully petitioned the United States District Court for the Southern District of New York via the Alabama Claims award, for compensation of the loss of the pilot boat William Bell during the Civil War. The case was called James Callahan v. The United States (No. 710). Joseph Gutman, Jr. was the authorized Commissioner for the Alabama Claims Court that took the testimonies and depositions. Total claims filed were for $24,000, that included the loss of vessel and for the supplies.

A deposition with Callahan was conducted on February 10, 1883, with his counsel and the counsel for the United States. In the deposition Callahan said that he was 70 years of age; lived in Brooklyn, New York; was a Sandy Hook pilot for 38 years; that he owned 5/16 of the William Bell and was captain of the boat. He was asked to recount the capture of the William Bell by Colonel John Taylor Wood, of the Confederate CSS Tallahassee.

The final award was made on June 5, 1883, that gave compensation of $9,289.59 to James Callahan, $9,410.14, who owned 5/16 shares and Henderson (see Joseph Henderson v. United States), who owned 5/16 shares in the William Bell, for a total award of $18,699.73. Although, this was less than the $24,000.00 amount claimed, it was a reasonable settlement.

Death
Captain James Callahan died on July 7, 1889, at the age of 78 at his home in Brooklyn, New York.

See also
 
 List of pilot boats and pilots

References

External links 
 

1812 births
1889 deaths
Burials at Green-Wood Cemetery
Maritime pilotage
People from Brooklyn
Sea captains